Leland Mark Bondhus (April 14, 1939 – December 12, 2010) was an American football player and coach. He played college football at South Dakota State University and was drafted in 1961 by the Green Bay Packers.  Bondhus served as the head football coach at Wartburg College in Waverly, Iowa from 1965 to 1972, compiling a record o 24–47–1 and guiding the Knights capture the Iowa Intercollegiate Athletic Conference (IIAC) title in 1968.

Head coaching record

References

1939 births
2013 deaths
American football offensive guards
South Dakota State Jackrabbits football players
United Football League (1961–1964) players
Wartburg Knights football coaches
People from Cottonwood County, Minnesota
Players of American football from Minnesota